Leucanopsis mailula is a moth of the subfamily Arctiinae. It was described by Schaus in 1927. It is found in Argentina.

References

mailula
Moths described in 1927